Cryptophis nigrescens is a species of venomous snake in the family  Elapidae. The species is endemic to eastern Australia.

Taxonomy
Cryptophis nigrescens was described by Albert Günther in 1862, assigning the new species to Hoplocephalus.

Geographic range
Cryptophis nigrescens is found in the Australian states of New South Wales, Queensland, and Victoria.

Common names
Common names for the species include short-tailed snake, small-eyed snake, and eastern small-eyed snake.

Reproduction
Cryptophis nigrescens is viviparous.

References

Further reading
Boulenger GA (1896). Catalogue of the Snakes in the British Museum (Natural History). Volume III., Containing the Colubridæ (Opisthoglyphæ and Proteroglyphæ) ... London: Trustees of the British Museum (Natural History). (Taylor and Francis, printers). xiv + 727 pp. + Plates I-XXV. (Denisonia nigrescens, p. 343).
Günther A (1862). "On new Species of Snakes in the Collection of the British Museum". Ann. Mag. Nat. Hist., Third Series 9: 124–132. (Hoplocephalus nigrescens, new species, p. 131 + Plate IX, figure 12).

nigrescens
Venomous snakes
Snakes of Australia
Reptiles described in 1862
Taxa named by Albert Günther